The Battle of Cape Spartel was an indecisive naval battle between a Franco-Spanish fleet under Admiral Luis de Córdova y Córdova and a British fleet under Admiral Richard Howe. These forces met on 20 October 1782 after Howe successfully resupplied Gibraltar, then under siege by Bourbon forces during the American Revolutionary War.

Background

When Spain entered the American War of Independence in 1779, one of its principal objectives was the capture of Gibraltar from Great Britain.  Shortly after war was declared, forces of Spain and France began the Great Siege of Gibraltar, blockading land access to the peninsula and enacting a somewhat porous naval blockade.  Britain successfully resupplied Gibraltar in both 1780 and 1781, and recognized the need to do so again in 1782.  The matter was seen as a critical by British political and military leaders, because Spain was seeking cession of the territory in peace talks.

The British Channel Fleet, which was under the command of Admiral Richard Howe, had a number of conflicting objectives to manage in the summer 1782.  In addition to protecting the English Channel from Franco-Spanish incursions, the fleet also had to deal with the possibility of Dutch action on the North Sea against the transport of critical naval supplies from the Baltic, and it was expected to protect the convoy that would resupply Gibraltar.  Even though intelligence received on 25 August indicated the Dutch fleet was in port at Texel, ten ships of the line were despatched to the North Sea while the convoy for Gibraltar took shape at Spithead.  These ships returned to port on 4 September.

The convoy that sailed on 11 September included 35 ships of the line, a large convoy of transports destined for Gibraltar, and additional convoys destined for the East and West Indies.  Admiral Howe's orders were to deliver the supplies to Gibraltar and then to return to England.  Because of bad weather and contrary winds, the fleet destined for Gibraltar did not arrive at Cape St. Vincent until 9 October.

The Franco-Spanish fleet tasked with the blockade of Gibraltar was anchored in Bay of Gibraltar. It consisted of 49 ships of the line, and was under the command of Spanish Admiral Luis de Córdova. The Spanish ships (numbering 35) were not in good condition. On 10 October a storm wrought havoc on the allied fleet: one ship of the line was driven aground, another was sent under Gibraltar's guns, and a third was swept through the Straits of Gibraltar into the Mediterranean.

Admiral Howe met with all of his captains, and gave detailed instructions for ensuring the safe arrival of the transports.  On 11 October the transports began entry into the straits, followed by covering fleet. Four transports successfully anchored at Gibraltar, but the remainder were carried by the strong currents into the Mediterranean. The fleet followed. Taking advantage of a west-northwest wind, de Córdova's fleet sailed in pursuit, while the Spanish admiral sent his smaller vessels to shadow the British. The British regrouped about 50 miles east of Gibraltar off the Spanish coast on 13 October, but sailed south toward the Moroccan coast upon the approach of the allied fleet. With a fair wind on the 15th, the British reentered the straits, and successfully brought the convoy into Gibraltar between the 16th and 18th.

Battle
On 19 October the allied fleet was sighted to the east of Gibraltar. Admiral Howe, seeking to avoid battle in the straits, weighed anchor and sailed west, with the allies following. Once clear of the straits, he reduced the fleet's sails, offering de Córdova, who held the weather gage, the option of engaging in battle. On the 20th, de Córdova signalled 'general chase', disregarding division places. The British line of battle was to starboard of the Franco-Spanish. At around 1 pm, and after Cordova's flagship, the 120-gun Santísima Trinidad reached the centre of the combined line, both fleets were about two miles apart. The British reduced sail in order to tighten their line of battle. At 5:45 the van of the Franco-Spanish fleet opened fire. The British returned fire, while Howe signalled 'retreat all sail', making at least 14 Franco-Spanish ships redundant, among them two three-deckers. No British ships were really engaged, despite the efforts of de Córdova's ships, which chased the British fleet. On the 21st, both fleets were some 12 miles apart. De Córdova made repairs and was ready to resume the action. However, no battle took place the next day as Howe had sailed back to Britain in line with his orders.

Aftermath
Howe succeeded in his main aim, ensuring that the convoy arrived safely, and returned to England. The success in resupplying the hard pressed garrison at Gibraltar ensured its survival at a time when British forces were suffering a demoralising succession of losses at Minorca, Florida and the West Indies.

The timely resupply combined with the failed Franco-Spanish attack of 13 September on Gibraltar also greatly strengthened the British hand at peace talks begun earlier in October. British diplomats steadfastly refused to part with Gibraltar, despite offers by Spain to trade most of its gains.

The sailing qualities of their ships (in particular the use of copper sheathing) enabled the British to decline an action. The Spanish Navy struggled to build faster ships to avoid these situations such as that of the Battle of Cape St. Vincent – the Moonlight Battle – two years before, when Rodney's coppered 18-ship fleet chased down and engaged de Lángara's 11-ship fleet. The Spanish Navy had been slow to begin coppering its own vessels. It was also limited by the slow speed of some of its older and heavier ships, like the Santisima Trinidad.

Order of battle

British (Howe)
34 ships of the line (according to Schomberg)

Franco-Spanish (De Cordova y Cordova)
46 ships of the line

Spanish
 Santísima Trinidad (120), Flagship, Teniente-General Luis de Córdova
 Rayo (80) Jefe d'Escadra Antonio Posada
 San Vicente Ferrer (80), Brigadier Ignacio Ponce de León
 Terrible (74)
 Arrogante (70)
 Brillante (70)
 Firme (70)
 Galicia (70)
 Guerrero (70)
 San Isidoro (70)
 San Isidro (70)
 San Joaquín (70)
 San Juan Bautista (70)
 San Justo (70)
 San Lorenzo (70)
 San Rafael (70)
 Santa Isabel (70)
 Serio (70)
 Triunfante (70)
 Vencedor (70)
 Castilla (64)
 España (64)
 Septentrión (64)

French
 Bretagne (110)
 Invincible (110), Lieutenant General Picquet de la Motte
 Majestueux (110), Lieutenant General Viscount De Rochecouart
 Royal Louis (110), Chef d'Escadre Antoine-Hilarion de Beausset
 Actif (74), Cillart de Surville
 Dictateur (74)
 Guerrier (74)
 Robuste (74), Captain Marquez de Nieuil
 Suffisant (74)
 Zodiaque (74)
 Indien (64)

The following ships were unable to take any part in the action:

Spanish
 Purísima Concepción (112), Teniente-Général Juan Bautista Bonet
 San Fernando (80), Teniente-General Miguel Gastón
 Africa (70)
 Oriente (70)
 San Eugenio (70)
 San Julián (70)
 Astuto (54)
 Miño (54)

French
 Terrible (110), Lieutenant General Count de Guichen
 Bien Aimé (74)
 Atlas (70)
 Lion (64), Captain Fournoue

Notes

References

External links
 Revolutionary War chronology
 Combate de Espartel. 20 de octubre de 1782 

Conflicts in 1782
Naval battles of the American Revolutionary War
Naval battles involving Great Britain
Naval battles involving France
Naval battles involving Spain
1782 in France
History of Tangier